The A18 is a road in England that links Doncaster in South Yorkshire with Ludborough in Lincolnshire, via Scunthorpe and Grimsby. Much of its route has been superseded by the M180 motorway.

Route

Principal settlements
 Doncaster
 Hatfield
 Scunthorpe
 Brigg
 Humberside International Airport
 Keelby
 Laceby
 Ludborough (merging with the A16 road, near Louth)

Doncaster – M180 

The A18 begins as a dual-carriageway and trunk road at the Balby Flyover junction with the A630 in Balby in Doncaster, under which runs the East Coast Main Line. It meets the A638 (former Great North Road) at the Sidings Roundabout then becomes Carr House Road, overlapping the A638. At the Racecourse Roundabout in Belle Vue, the A638 exits to the right (former Great North Road), and the road becomes Leger Way. Near Intake, it becomes a single carriageway and continues to Scunthorpe. At the Sandall Park Roundabout the road meets its old route and becomes Thorne Road. At the Shaw Lane Roundabout it meets the A630 and runs under a railway line. At the next roundabout, on the edge of Doncaster, the A630 leaves to the right, as a trunk road to the M18. The road, now without trunk (primary) status, passes through Edenthorpe.

The road enters Dunsville as High Street and becomes Doncaster Road. In Hatfield, it becomes Manor Road and then High Street, and crosses the M18. It becomes Epworth Road and meets the A1146 near Hatfield Woodhouse, then meets the A614 from the right from Finningley. The road becomes Tudworth Road and overlaps the A614; at the Tudworth Roundabout, the A18 continues to the right of the M180

M180 – Brigg

As High Levels Bank, it crosses a flat landscape known as Hatfield Chase and enters North Lincolnshire. It runs alongside the large North Engine Drain next to the M180. At Crowle, it meets the A161, close to junction 2 of the M180 and crosses Pilfrey Bridge over the Three Rivers. The A18 meets the B1392 (for Keadby) and passes through Gunness, crossing the B1216 (for Burringham) as Station Road. It meets the A1077 Scunthorpe ring road and the M181 at the Frodingham Grange Roundabout.

The road enters the Queensway Roundabout for the trunk road A159 at Old Brumby, becoming the non-trunk dual-carriageway Queensway. It passes through New Brumby, and at the Ashby Ville Roundabout it meets the A1029. The road meets the Briggate Lodge Roundabout on the line of Ermine Street, for junction 4 for the M180 and the trunk-road A15.

Brigg – Ludborough

At Scawby Brook, there is a roundabout with the B1206 (for Scawby), and the road enters Brigg to the left as Scawby Road, becoming Bridge Street and then Ancholme Way. The B1206 (former A15) leaves to the left and the road enters Wrawby as Brigg Road and becomes Melton Road.

The road passes through Melton Ross and passes next to Humberside Airport. At the B1210 (for Brocklesby) junction, the road heads to the right, entering Lincolnshire and the district of West Lindsey, and passes through Great Limber as High Street. It meets the B1211 and heads to the right as Barton Street (a Roman road). Near Riby, the road becomes a trunk road (until its terminus) then a dual-carriageway close to where it enters North East Lincolnshire.

The road meets the A46 Grimsby road, and heads straight on over the roundabout. The A18 used to continue eastwards from here along the present A46 into Grimsby, and now continues southwards over Welbeck Hill along the former B1431. The road re-enters Lincolnshire and the district of East Lindsey. The road follows the former A16 from Ludborough to near Utterby, where is meets the A16 (for Louth).

The last section, between the junction with the A46 at Laceby and the junction with the A16 at Ludborough, was designated by the Road Safety Foundation as the most dangerous in the country for car drivers, drawing on collated data on the number of fatal and serious-injury collisions in 2010. During a 2015 inquest, a coroner called for an independent review of the A18 near Grimsby; the coroner was reacting to the death of a family after a collision with a lorry. In 2016, the government announced that £175 million would be made available for safety improvements on roads like the A18.

A18(M) motorway

The A18(M) was built in 1972 but was redesignated after the M180 was built in 1978.

The western end of the M180 from M18 junction 5 to the junction 1 eastbound slip road was previously part of the A18(M). The eastbound slip road to the roundabout was the eastbound carriageway A18(M). About  of the westbound A18(M) carriageway was abandoned when the M180 was built on a new alignment.

References

External links

 SABRE
 Pathetic Motorways: A18(M)

Roads in England
Transport in Lincolnshire
Roads in Yorkshire
Roads in Doncaster
Borough of North Lincolnshire
Borough of North East Lincolnshire